Notostira erratica is a species of bugs from a Miridae family, subfamily Mirinae that can be found everywhere in Europe except for Azores, Benelux, Faroe Islands, Madeira, Malta, and African and Asia ones such as Canary Islands and Cyprus.

Biology
Occurs on dry grass-dominated areas where it lives on various grasses, notably 
Calamagrostis and Alopecurus. 

As in N. elongata males winter in the egg stage, and the females wintering in the imago.

References

Miridae
Bugs described in 1758
Hemiptera of Europe
Taxa named by Carl Linnaeus